The Triumphs of Love and Honour is a 1731 tragedy by the British writer Thomas Cooke.

The original Drury Lane cast included William Mills as Aristarchus, Theophilus Cibber as Philander, Kitty Clive as Urania and Charlotte Charke as Thalia.

References

Bibliography
 Baines, Paul & Ferarro, Julian & Rogers, Pat. The Wiley-Blackwell Encyclopedia of Eighteenth-Century Writers and Writing, 1660-1789. Wiley-Blackwell, 2011.
 Burling, William J. A Checklist of New Plays and Entertainments on the London Stage, 1700-1737. Fairleigh Dickinson Univ Press, 1992.

1731 plays
Tragedy plays
West End plays
British plays